is a city located in Kyoto Prefecture, Japan.  the city has an estimated population of 70,433 and a population density of 2,893 persons per km². The total area is 24.35 km².

The city was founded on November 1, 1977 and currently has a sister city in Milan, Ohio.

As the bamboo filaments Thomas Alva Edison used for his early light bulb tests came from Kyoto, Yawata has an Edison Memorial and Edison Celebration.

The Iwashimizu Hachimangu is located in Yawata.

Demographics
Per Japanese census data, the population of Yawata has remained relatively steady in recent decades.

References

External links

 Yawata City official website 
 Edison Ceremonial

Cities in Kyoto Prefecture